Chhabra is one of the 200 Legislative Assembly constituencies of Rajasthan state in India. It is in Baran district and is a segment of Jhalawar–Baran (Lok Sabha constituency).

Members of Vidhan Sabha
 1951 : Ved Pal Tayagi (INC) 
 1977 : Prem Singh (JNP)
 1977 bypoll in November : Sitting CM Bhairon Singh Shekhawat (Janata Party) 
 1980 : Bhairon Singh Shekhawat (Bharatiya Janata Party)
 1985 : Pratap Singh (BJP)
 1990 : Bhairon Singh Shekhawat (BJP). Resigned from this seat, and retained Dholpur seat.
 1993 : Pratap Singh Singhvi (BJP)
 1998 : Pratap Singh Singhvi (BJP)
 2003 : Pratap Singh Singhvi (BJP)
 2008 : Karan Singh (INC) 
 2013 : Pratap Singh Singhvi (BJP)

Election Results

1951 Vidhan Sabha
 Ved Pal Tayagi (INC) : 6,011 votes  
 Shankar Sahaya (RRP) : 2,713

1977 Vidhan Sabha
 Prem Singh (JNP) : 33,302 votes 
 Kishori Lal (INC) : 8246

1980 Vidhan Sabha
 Bhairon Singh Shekhawat (BJP) : 32,994 votes 
 Ram Parsad Meena (INC-I) : 15974

2013 Vidhan Sabha
 Pratap Singh (BJP) : 88,193 votes  
 Mansingh Dhanoriya (NPP) : 26,808

2018

See also
List of constituencies of the Rajasthan Legislative Assembly
Baran district

References

Baran district
Assembly constituencies of Rajasthan